The Surrogate's Courthouse (also the Hall of Records and 31 Chambers Street) is a historic building at the northwest corner of Chambers and Centre Streets in the Civic Center of Manhattan in New York City. Completed in 1907, it was designed in the Beaux Arts style. John Rochester Thomas created the original plans while Arthur J. Horgan and Vincent J. Slattery oversaw the building's completion. The building faces City Hall Park and the Tweed Courthouse to the south and the Manhattan Municipal Building to the east.

The Surrogate's Courthouse is a seven-story steel-framed structure with a granite facade and elaborate marble interiors. The fireproof frame was designed to safely accommodate the city's paper records. The exterior is decorated with 54 sculptures by Philip Martiny and Henry Kirke Bush-Brown, as well as three-story colonnades with Corinthian columns along Chambers and Reade Streets. The basement houses the New York City Municipal Archives. The fifth floor contains the New York Surrogate's Court for New York County, which handles probate and estate proceedings for the New York State Unified Court System.

The Hall of Records building had been planned since the late 19th century to replace an outdated building in City Hall Park; plans for the current building were approved in 1897. Construction took place between 1899 and 1907, having been subject to several delays because of controversies over funding, sculptures, and Horgan and Slattery's involvement after Thomas's death in 1901. Renamed the Surrogate's Courthouse in 1962, the building has undergone few alterations over the years. The Surrogate's Courthouse is listed on the National Register of Historic Places as a National Historic Landmark, and its facade and interior are both New York City designated landmarks.

Site
The Surrogate's Courthouse is in the Civic Center neighborhood of Manhattan, just north of City Hall Park. It occupies an entire city block bounded by Chambers Street to the south, Centre Street to the east, Reade Street to the north, and Elk Street to the west. Other nearby buildings and locations include 49 Chambers and 280 Broadway to the west; the Ted Weiss Federal Building and African Burial Ground National Monument to the northwest; the Thurgood Marshall United States Courthouse to the northeast; the Manhattan Municipal Building to the east; and the Tweed Courthouse and New York City Hall to the southwest, within City Hall Park.

The ground slopes downward from south to north; the original ground elevation was below Reade Street and close to sea level. The surrounding area contains evidence of the interments of individuals, mostly of African descent, but the foundations of the Surrogate's Courthouse may have destroyed any remnants of corpses on the site. In the 18th and early 19th centuries, the Surrogate's Courthouse site was on a hill called "Pot Baker's" or "Potter's Hill", so named because several families in the pottery industry lived or worked nearby. The site also included a water reservoir built of stone and maintained by the Manhattan Company from 1799 until 1842, when the Croton Aqueduct opened. In the mid-19th century, the site contained small loft buildings. Before the completion of Elk Street in 1901, the site was part of a larger city block bounded by Broadway and Chambers, Centre, and Reade Streets.

Architecture
The Surrogate's Courthouse was designed in the Beaux-Arts style, John Rochester Thomas being the original architect. After Thomas's death in 1901, Arthur J. Horgan and Vincent J. Slattery oversaw the completion of the plan. Their relatively unknown firm had connections to the politically powerful Tammany Hall organization of the time. The final design largely conforms to Thomas's original plans, though Horgan and Slattery were mostly responsible for the sculptural ornamentation. Fay Kellogg, who designed the prominent double staircase in the building's lobby, helped prepare plans for the Hall of Records. The building has undergone relatively few alterations since its completion in 1907.

The Surrogate's Courthouse's seven-story granite facade wraps around the building's structural frame, while the interiors are elaborately designed in marble. The building was designed to be fireproof to house the city's paper records safely. The interior spaces are popular with film and television production companies and have been used in many commercials, TV series, and movies. Besides housing the Surrogate's Court for New York County, the building contains the New York City Municipal Archives, the New York City Department of Records and Information Services (DORIS)'s City Hall Library, and the New York City Department of Cultural Affairs.

Facade

The facade of the Surrogate's Courthouse consists mostly of granite from Hallowell, Maine, with ashlar masonry. It is split vertically into a two-story rusticated base, a three-story midsection, a sixth story and a seventh story in a mansard roof. The northern and southern elevations are split vertically into five bays, with multiple windows on each floor in the center bays, while the western and eastern elevations are split into three bays.

The central portion of the southern (Chambers Street) elevation contains three double-height arched doorways, each of which contains a pair of doors and a window with bronze grilles. The doorways are flanked by granite columns, each cast from a single granite slab and topped by modified composite capitals. This entrance was wainscoted entirely with Siena marble at the building's completion. There are side entrances at the center of the western elevation on Elk Street, from which there is a small flight of steps, as well as at the center of the eastern elevation on Centre Street. The Reade Street elevation contains a wheelchair-accessible entrance.

On the northern and southern elevations, the central five windows of the third through fifth stories are flanked by a projecting Corinthian style colonnade with four single columns between two paired columns at either end. On all four elevations, the outermost bays are designed with window openings on the second, third, fifth, and sixth stories, and sculptures around porthole windows on the fourth story. The remaining six windows on the north and south, and the center nine windows on the west and east, are slightly recessed behind the end bays, with different window designs on each story. An entablature and a cornice runs above the fifth story, and another cornice runs above the sixth story. The seventh story contains dormer windows with carved hoods, projecting from the mansard roof in all except the end bays.

Sculptures 

The exterior features fifty-four sculptures by Philip Martiny and Henry Kirke Bush-Brown. Martiny was hired for the main sculptural groups, while Bush-Brown designed the smaller sculptures. Like the rest of the facade, the statues were carved from Hallowell granite.

On Chambers and Centre Streets, Martiny carved 24 standing figures at the sixth floor, under the cornice. These sculptures depict eminent figures from the city's past, including Peter Stuyvesant, DeWitt Clinton, David Pietersen De Vries, and mayors Caleb Heathcote, Abram Stevens Hewitt, Philip Hone, Cadwallader David Colden and James Duane. Martiny also designed the groups of sculptures flanking the Chambers and Centre Street entrances. Three sculptures flank the Chambers Street entrance, while two originally flanked the Centre Street entrance. The Centre Street sculptures, depicting Justice and Authority, were removed in 1959; they were relocated to the New York County Courthouse.

On all four sides, Bush-Brown designed groups of allegorical figures for the roof. The figures were arranged in standing, sitting, or reclining postures. Figures depicting Heritage and Maternity are at the base of the central dormer on Chambers Street. A similar dormer at the center of Reade Street has figures depicting Instruction, Study, Law, and History. The central Centre Street dormer has figures of Inscription and Custody and the central dormer on the west side has Industry and Commerce.

Interior

Entrance vestibules 

The rectangular entrance vestibule from Chambers Street contains rusticated yellow marble-clad walls. Just opposite the arched entryways is an arcade with decorative cartouches. Double doors made of mahogany are set within marble doorways at either end of the vestibule. The German sculptor Albert Weinert created two marble sculptural groups, one above each set of doorways; these depict the 1624 purchase of Manhattan Island and the 1898 creation of the City of Greater New York. The vestibule's elliptical ceiling contains mosaic murals and panels created by William de Leftwich Dodge. Of the four mosaic murals, three depict the probate process (in reference to the Surrogates' Court) and the other depicts the continuity of records. The ceiling's triangular mosaic panels depict Egyptian and Greek motifs along with zodiac signs. The mosaic tiles are mostly colored red, green, and blue on dull gold. The vestibule also contains a bronze chandelier, ornamental bronze radiators and a patterned marble floor.

Smaller entrance vestibules also exist on the west and east ends of the Surrogate's Courthouse; they are largely similar, except for the steps outside the west vestibule. Decorative bronze-and-glass enclosures frame the doorways, while there are mosaic lunettes over the two side doors from the vestibules. In the elliptical ceiling vaults of these vestibules, Dodge also designed mosaics set in glass. The mosaics are generally blue and gold but have green and rose accent strips. The ceiling is divided into several panels with decorative elements like garlands, urns, and acanthus scrolls.

Lobby and lower stories 

The entrance vestibules lead to the main lobby, a triple-story space whose design was inspired by that of the Palais Garnier, the opera house of the Paris Opera. Yellow Sienna marble was used throughout the lobby. Surrounding the lobby space on the first floor is an arched gallery with rusticated piers, scrolled keystones, red marble roundels, and garlands linking the roundels and keystones. A decorative frieze runs above the first floor gallery. A marble double staircase with balustrade flanks the western entrance archway on the first floor, ascending two flights to an intermediate landing, where a single flight leads to the second floor. On the second floor is a colonnaded gallery containing engaged columns with Ionic-style capitals. The tops of the lobby walls contain decorative entablatures. The ceiling has a bronze elliptical arched vault reaching the height of the third floor.

The hallways on the first floor contain marble walls and multicolored patterned marble floors. The passageways contain groin vaulted ceilings with chandeliers. There are recessed mahogany double-doors leading to the offices, as well as red marble roundels above each doorway. Service functions, such as fuse boxes, are contained within bronze boxes. The second-floor gallery's arches divide the gallery into bays. Within each bay, there are shallow, domed ceilings supported on decorative pendentives, and a cornice runs beneath each dome. On the walls, there are arched openings with mahogany double doors. Above the double staircase in the lobby, a balustraded staircase rises from the second-floor gallery to the third floor, with an intermediate landing above the double stairway.

Upper stories 
The third through fifth floors are largely similar in plan and surround an interior light court above the lobby. These floors are connected by a staircase similar in design to the one connecting the second and third floors. The floor surfaces of the third through fifth stories are made of mosaic tile, and the walls consist of gray-veined marble panels. Each story contains different decorative designs on the frames surrounding the doorways and on the openings facing the light court.

The two Surrogates' courtrooms, on the fifth floor, handle probate and estate proceedings for the New York State Unified Court System. Part of the original design, the rooms contain similar layouts with minor differences in decorative detail. The courtrooms have gilded, paneled plaster ceilings with decorative reliefs and ornate chandeliers. The north courtroom is finished in Santo Domingo mahogany and has four carved panels signifying wisdom, truth, civilization and degradation, as well as six repeating motifs and several portraits of surrogates. The south courtroom is finished in English oak, with French Renaissance style decorative elements. Overlooking each courtroom is a marble balcony, reached by staircases in the respective courtrooms. There are also ornately carved fireplaces, which contain marble mantelpieces lined with bronze surrounds made by Tiffany & Co. The seventh floor and the attic housed the city's records on steel shelves until 2017.

Basement 
The vaults of the building's basement extend underneath both Chambers and Reade Streets, descending  under Chambers Street and  under Reade Street. The Surrogate's Courthouse had been designed with a small power plant in the basement, which provided power to the building and served neighboring municipally owned buildings.

The basement contains the municipal government's City Hall Library as well as the Municipal Archives. The library consists of two publicly accessible reading rooms, as well as several storerooms beneath the main basement for the Municipal Archives. The collection contains over 400,000 publications, including 66,000 books and 285,000 newspapers, journals, magazines, and periodical clippings.

History
In 1831, the original Hall of Records opened northeast of City Hall on the site of the "New Gaol", the old city jail, in present-day City Hall Park. The New-York Mirror described the original building as a Grecian-style structure with marble-columned porticoes on each side, as well as stucco walls, a copper roof, and masonry floors. In 1870, the original building was expanded by one story and a "fireproof" roof was erected. The first Hall of Records became dilapidated over time and, as early as 1872, lawyers had objected to the rundown condition of the building. Despite its fireproof appearance, the first Hall of Records used wood extensively in its floors and roof. The first Hall of Records was razed in 1903 and an entrance to the New York City Subway's Brooklyn Bridge–City Hall/Chambers Street station was built there.

Planning and construction

Need and plans 

By March 1896, a grand jury had reported the old Hall of Records was "unsafe and susceptible to destruction by fire". The New York City Department of Health reportedly "repeatedly condemned" conditions in the old building. In a November 1896 meeting of the New York City Board of Estimate, Ashbel P. Fitch, the New York City Comptroller, offered a resolution to create a committee to select a site for a new Hall of Records building. A coalition of lawyers, businesspeople, real estate developers, and property owners formed the next month to advocate for a new building.  At the time, the city government preferred that new municipal buildings be erected in the area immediately outside City Hall Park, instead of inside the park, as the old Hall of Records had been.

The state legislature authorized the new Hall of Records building in early 1897, and the Board of Estimate recommended a site on the west side of Centre Street, between Reade and Chambers Streets. The site was approved in April 1897 despite the objection of Fitch, who believed that a site immediately to the north would be cheaper. The site approval included an extension of Elm (now Elk) Street southward from Reade to Chambers Street, forming the site's western boundary  completed in 1901.

Thomas was indirectly chosen as the architect through the second of four architectural design competitions for the Manhattan Municipal Building, held between 1892 and 1894. From the 134 plans submitted, six finalist designs were chosen in 1894. In February 1896, the Municipal Building Commission of New York City awarded Thomas the first prize in the design competition, which included his employment as the architect of the municipal building. The municipal building for which Thomas had prepared plans had been canceled in 1894. Thomas was selected as the Hall of Records' architect upon the urging of then-mayor William Lafayette Strong. According to architecture critic Montgomery Schuyler, Strong had reminded the Board of Estimate that Thomas "deserved some consolation for a failure that had occurred by no fault of his own". Thomas presented his plans to the Board of Estimate in May 1897 which referred them to a committee composed of Schuyler, architect William Robert Ware and philanthropist Henry Gurdon Marquand. The Board of Estimate approved them and authorized bids for the building's construction in November 1897.

Start of construction 
Thirteen companies submitted bids for granite in December 1897; John Peirce won the contract to supply white Hallowell granite. Difficulties in acquiring the plots for the building's site delayed the start of work. Some of the old buildings on the site were sold in early 1898. Other property owners resisted the seizure of their property through eminent domain. The resistance of one landowner (the Wendel family, which owned a myriad of Manhattan properties and had a policy to "never sell anything") required the state legislature to pass a special act to obtain the small portion of the site owned by the Wendels. Lessees also objected to the fact that they would not be compensated for the unexpired terms of their leases. Further complicating the construction process, there were several unsuccessful competing schemes for the site, including proposals for the municipal building and a new county courthouse, both in 1900. As late as 1904, there existed plans to convert the by then nearly complete building into one wing of a new county courthouse.

Work on the foundations began in early 1899, but was halted after about ninety days. The main reason was a lack of funding; several bond authorizations for the building had been delayed. Peirce filed a lawsuit in July 1898 to receive payment for the granite he had supplied, and the State Supreme Court issued a mandamus to authorize a bond issue to pay Pierce. The City Council passed a bill to that effect on August 3. The City Council adopted a resolution in a contentious vote the following week authorizing the issuance of $2.1 million in bonds (about$  million in ) for the building's construction; the City Council president Randolph Guggenheimer was called to cast the deciding vote.

Meanwhile, the Tammany Hall-affiliated Robert Anderson Van Wyck won the 1897 mayoral election, and soon after his inauguration, accused the Strong Administration of "extravagance" in its design. Ever since the election, Van Wyck had wanted to appoint Horgan and Slattery, who were friendly with the Tammany political machine, as the project's architects. In 1899, the mayor hired the firm to conduct a report on possible ways to reduce the cost of the interior furnishings. The original interior cost was to be $2.5 million (about$  million in ). Following Horgan and Slattery's recommendations, the interior appropriation was reduced by $1 million (about$  million in ), since the interior surfaces were to be made of cement rather than marble. The Board of Estimate received several bids for interior decoration in mid-1900, but it rejected all the bids, since the Comptroller's office had received "a number of complaints" that Thomas had shown favoritism to certain contractors. Guggenheimer laid the building's ceremonial cornerstone at a ceremony on April 13, 1901.

Change of architect and completion 

Work had progressed slightly when Thomas died on August 28, 1901. Under pressure from Van Wyck, the Board of Estimate appointed Horgan and Slattery as the new architects two weeks later, prompting the Thomas estate to sue for damages. The New York Times criticized the change in plans as a "horganizing and slatterifying" of Thomas's original design. Comptroller Bird S. Coler protested against Horgan and Slattery's appointment, and Fitch refused to give Thomas's plans to Horgan and Slattery; the firm could not collect fees unless they had the plans. After Seth Low won the 1901 New York City mayoral election, he attempted unsuccessfully to cancel Horgan and Slattery's contract, but succeeded in limiting the number of changes made to Thomas's plan. By October 1902, a decision had been made to demolish the old Hall of Records, and at the end of the year, records were moved to a temporary site in the Morton Building on Nassau Street. Early in 1903, the Board of Estimate moved to approve Thomas's original plans for the interior of the new building.

Controversies arose following Martiny's and Bush-Brown's selection as sculptors for the Hall of Records building. Critics said the two sculptors could not commission the sculptures to the desired specifications in a short enough time period, while the city's Municipal Art Commission objected that Horgan and Slattery had never presented them with general plans for the sculptures and decorative marble. Mayor Low upheld the sculptural contracts in June 1903, which The New York Times estimated to be worth $75,000. The statues were delivered in mid-1903, but not installed for several years, because the Municipal Art Commission refused to approve them until 1906.

Three city departments were scheduled to move into the new Hall of Records building in May 1904, when the leases on their existing premises expired, but the building was not yet complete despite assurances made the previous year by Jacob A. Cantor, the Manhattan borough president. In an attempt to speed up occupancy of the building, the installation of murals had been delayed. Further delays were announced in 1905, including the plan for Horgan and Slattery to remodel the not-yet-complete interior for $500,000. The contractors made excuses for the delays after an inquiry from the Board of Estimate.

Use

Early to mid-20th century 

The first city-government employees moved into the building in December 1906. Shortly after the building's opening, news outlets reported that some of the building's "marble" was made of plaster, but this was consistent with the construction contract calling for "plaster enrichment". The substitution was not the result of corruption, but of the many changes in plans under the administrations of three mayors. Upon the building's completion, Horgan and Slattery claimed its final cost was $5.063 million, while other estimates placed the cost as high as $10 million. In any case, despite the Hall of Records building's expense and the $90,000 annual maintenance cost, the New-York Tribune reported in 1907 that the building was already dirty and that some furnishings had been damaged to an extent described as "little short of criminal".

From the beginning, the Hall of Records contained space for New York City's departments of finance, taxes and assessments, and law, as well as the New York County Register, County Clerk, and Surrogate's Court. Other agencies and organizations occupied the building as well. The Vehicular Tunnel Commission was established in the Hall of Records in 1919, as was an employment bureau for soldiers.

The original elevators in the Hall of Records operated for several decades and, over the years, the number of elevators was cut from ten to six. Faults in the Hall of Records' elevator system had resulted in several deaths, while elevator operators were reluctant to operate them. The city government spent several hundred thousand dollars to repair the faulty elevators during the 1930s and 1940s, and new elevators were installed in the building in 1953. Another modification was made to the eastern facade in 1959, when the statues flanking the Centre Street entrance were removed because of street-widening work and the expansion of the underlying subway station.

Late 20th century to present 

The Hall of Records was renamed the Surrogate's Courthouse in 1962. The New York City Council adopted a resolution to rename the structure that October because most of the building's space was used by the court and related offices. During the mid-1960s, the government of New York City proposed a new Civic Center municipal building, which entailed destroying several surrounding buildings. The architects of the planned building had proposed the courthouse's eventual demolition because the plans called for the new building and City Hall to be the only structures in an expanded City Hall Park. The redevelopment plans were ultimately scrapped during the 1975 New York City fiscal crisis.

During a renovation of the Municipal Building in the 1970s, the Municipal Reference Center was moved to the Surrogate's Courthouse. The Department of Records and Information Services (DORIS) was founded in 1977, with its headquarters on the first floor of the Surrogate's Courthouse. DORIS combined the functions of the Municipal Reference Center with those of the Municipal Archives and Record Center, a separate agency. Until 2001, the New York City Department of Finance used part of the second floor for registering and storing mortgages and deeds. The New York City Department of Cultural Affairs moved into a  space on the second floor in 2006, following a $4.1 million renovation designed by Swanke Hayden Connell Architects. The Building Energy Exchange was also established in the Surrogate's Courthouse in 2015, occupying a  space once used as a courtroom and as a film set for the television show Law & Order.

By the 21st century, the Surrogate's Courthouse no longer provided sufficient space for the city's records. In 2017, DORIS began moving the records to the New York State Archives, as well as to the Municipal Archives in the building's basement. In addition, between 2016 and 2020, Urbahn Architects renovated the lobby's skylight, which involved replacing several parts of the corroded steel frame as well as adding replicas of the original skylight's glass blocks. The skylight replacement project received the 2020 Lucy Moses Preservation Award from the New York Landmarks Conservancy.

Reception and landmark designations

Critical reviews of the Surrogate's Courthouse have largely been positive. Upon the Hall of Records' completion, the Brooklyn Daily Eagle said: "The exterior of the big granite pile on Chambers and Centre streets may appeal to the artistic eye, but the interior is a positive revelation, and there is probably nothing like it in any city of the Union." Montgomery Schuyler, who had been on the committee that approved Thomas's plans, wrote in 1905 that "the Hall of Records comes nearer than any other public building in New York to recalling" what he described as a "Parisian" quality. Schuyler said that the design "has reproduced the effect of monuments designed under so much simpler conditions".

Architecture critic Paul Goldberger stated that the Surrogate's Courthouse's interior was one of the city's finest Beaux Arts interiors. He compared the building favorably to two contemporaries in lower Manhattan, the smaller Chamber of Commerce Building and the larger Custom House. The New York City Landmarks Preservation Commission (LPC) described the Hall of Records building as "representative of a period when the Municipality of New York felt itself coming of age".

The LPC designated the exterior of the Surrogate's Courthouse as a New York City landmark in 1966, and the interior was similarly designated in 1976. The building was placed on the National Register of Historic Places in 1972, and it was also designated a National Historic Landmark in 1977 for its architecture. The Surrogate's Courthouse building is also located within two historic districts. It is part of the African Burial Ground and the Commons Historic District, which was designated a city landmark district in 1993. The building is also part of the African Burial Ground Historic District, a National Historic Landmark District.

See also

 List of New York City Designated Landmarks in Manhattan below 14th Street
 National Historic Landmarks in New York City
 National Register of Historic Places listings in Manhattan below 14th Street

References

Notes

Citations

Sources

External links
 

Archives in the United States
Beaux-Arts architecture in New York City
Civic Center, Manhattan
Courthouses in New York (state)
Government buildings completed in 1907
Government buildings on the National Register of Historic Places in Manhattan
National Historic Landmarks in Manhattan
New York City Designated Landmarks in Manhattan
New York City interior landmarks
Outdoor sculptures in Manhattan